Cárteles Unidos (English: United Cartels), also known as La Resistencia (English: The Resistance) is a Mexican criminal enforcer squad composed of well-trained  gunmen from the Sinaloa Cartel, Gulf Cartel and Knights Templar Cartel originally formed to expel the Los Zetas Cartel from the states of Michoacán and Jalisco. However, Cárteles Unidos' current main rival has now become the Jalisco New Generation Cartel; a paramilitary criminal organization based in the neighboring state of Jalisco.

History
La Resistencia gang was originally created by Sinaloa Cartel leader Ignacio Coronel Villarreal in 2010 soon after the rival gang Los Zetas began encroaching in Michoacán. Originally, La Resistencia was composed of gunmen from the Milenio Cartel which was loyal to the Sinaloa Cartel. They were also supported by the local Michoacán cartel La Familia Michoacana to fight against Los Zetas and the Beltrán-Leyva Cartel. Then, the Milenio Cartel was incorporated into the Sinaloa Cartel, while La Familia and Beltran-Leyva cartels were destroyed by federal security forces. In 2011, La Resistencia continued its violent campaign against Los Zetas by joining forces between the Sinaloa, Gulf and Knights Templar Cartels (itself a splinter from La Familia).

Alliances change
With the capture of Óscar Nava Valencia, leader of the Milenio cartel and the death of Ignacio Coronel Villarreal of the Sinaloa cartel, the Milenio cartel broke into many factions, the most notable being a renewed La Resistencia, headed by Ramiro Pozos El Molca. The neighboring Jalisco New Generation Cartel (CJNG) headed by Nemesio Oseguera El Mencho took notice of the collapse of the Milenio cartel and began its own war for control of the region.

On March 1, 2011, Mexican federal police arrested a man they claimed to be the leader of "La Resistencia" Cartel, Víctor Manuel Torres García, alias "El Papirrín". On August 1, 2011, La Resistencia commander, Neri Salgado Harrison, was arrested in Michoacán by the Mexican Federal Police. Salgado was also the head of the Apatzingan plaza, and directed the production of methamphetamine in clandestine drug labs.

On September 11, 2012, Federal Police forces arrested Ramiro Pozos González a.k.a. "El Molca". Mexican federal authorities identified him as the supreme leader of La Resistencia. He is blamed for the massacre of 26 people in Guadalajara on November 2011. 
Due to CJNG's advances in the Tierra Caliente (Mexico) region, La Resistencia made an alliance in 2015 with Los Viagras and remnants of the Familia Michoacana, Knights Templar, and local self-defence groups to expel the CJNG out of the region, resulting in violent conflict since 2017 in the region.

See also
 Merida Initiative
 Mexican Drug War

References

Organizations established in 2010
2010 establishments in Mexico
Gangs in Mexico
Paramilitary organizations based in Mexico
Mexican drug war
Gulf Cartel
Sinaloa Cartel